The 2003 Middle Tennessee Blue Raiders football team represented Middle Tennessee State University as a member of the Sun Belt Conference during the 2003 NCAA Division I FBS football season. Led by fifth-year head coach Andy McCollum, the Blue Raiders compiled an overall record of 4–8 record with a mark of 3–3 in conference play, placing in a three-way tie for third in the Sun Belt.

Schedule

References

Middle Tennessee
Middle Tennessee Blue Raiders football seasons
Middle Tennessee Blue Raiders football